Irina-Camelia Begu and Simona Halep were the defending champions, but Halep chose not to participate. Begu was scheduled to play alongside Zheng Saisai, but the latter withdrew due to a viral illness.

Peng Shuai and Yang Zhaoxuan won the title, defeating Duan Yingying and Renata Voráčová in the final, 6–4, 6–3.

Seeds

Draw

Draw

References
Main Draw

WTA Shenzhen Open - Doubles
WTA Shenzhen Open